The  Clinton B. Ford Observatory  is an astronomical observatory that is operated by the Ithaca College physics department.  The observatory is located in the forest on the south end of the Ithaca College campus in Ithaca, New York (United States).  It was constructed in 1998 using funds from the National Science Foundation and a bequest from the late Clinton B. Ford.  It houses a CCT-16 16-inch (0.4 m) f/8 Cassegrain telescope.

Nearby observatories

Fuertes Observatory, Cornell University, Ithaca, New York
Hartung-Boothroyd Observatory, Cornell University, Ithaca, New York
 Kopernik Space Education Center, Vestal, New York

See also
 List of astronomical observatories
 List of observatory codes

References

External links
 Observatory news
 Ithaca College physics department
 Ithaca Clear Sky Clock Forecasts of observing conditions covering Ford Observatory.

Astronomical observatories in New York (state)
Ithaca College